Nicolas Hülkenberg (born 19 August 1987) is a German professional racing driver who is currently competing in the Formula One World Championship for Haas F1 Team. This comes after serving as a reserve driver for Aston Martin F1 Team for the year of 2022. In 2015, he also contested two rounds of the 2015 FIA World Endurance Championship season for Porsche, winning the 24 Hours of Le Mans on his first attempt. He was the 2009 GP2 Series champion, and is a previous champion of both the Formula 3 Euro Series and A1 Grand Prix, as part of A1 Team Germany. He is one of six drivers since 2005 to win the GP2 Series/Formula 2 championship in his debut season, the others being Lewis Hamilton, Nico Rosberg, Charles Leclerc, George Russell, and Oscar Piastri.

He was promoted to a race seat with the team for the  season, joining Paul di Resta. In  he drove for the Sauber team, with Mexican driver Esteban Gutiérrez as his teammate. Hülkenberg returned to Force India for the  season. He was replaced by Esteban Ocon for the 2020 Formula One season. He returned to Formula One in 2020, driving for Racing Point in three races. He then returned again to replace Sebastian Vettel at Aston Martin at the first two races of the 2022 season, following Vettel's positive COVID test. He returned as a full-time driver for the 2023 season, driving for Haas F1 Team.

Early life 
Hülkenberg was born in Emmerich am Rhein, North Rhine-Westphalia, West Germany to Klaus Dieter and Susanne Hülkenberg. Dieter Hülkenberg owns a shipping company, Hülkenberg Spedition e. K, based in Emmerich am Rhein. Hülkenberg trained as a freight forwarding agent at his father's company. He is fluent in German, Dutch, French and English.

Career

Early career
Hülkenberg made his karting debut in 1997, at the age of 10. In 2002 he was German Junior Karting Champion and the following year he won the German Kart Championship.

Hülkenberg was previously managed by Willi Weber, the long-time manager of Michael Schumacher. He also praised Hülkenberg as an "unbelievable talent" and said he reminded him of Schumacher as a young driver. He also stated that he nicknamed him "The Hulk", after the fictional superhero, in reference to Hülkenberg changing his personality whilst at the wheel.

Formula BMW (2005)
Hülkenberg made his German Formula BMW debut in 2005, dominating the championship and winning the title comfortably. He finished first in the Formula BMW world final but was stripped of the win after it was claimed he had brake-tested his rivals during a safety car period.

A1 Grand Prix (2006–2007)

Hülkenberg also joined the German A1 Grand Prix team for the 2006–07 season. Nine wins in his rookie season made him the most successful driver in A1GP history. It meant he almost single-handedly won Germany the championship with 128 points, 35 more than Team New Zealand.

Formula Three (2006–2008)

Hülkenberg finished fifth in the German Formula Three Championship (ATS Formel 3 Cup) in 2006. For 2007 he switched to the Formula 3 Euro Series with the ASM team that had taken Lewis Hamilton and Paul di Resta to the last two championships. His first win came at the Norisring from 18th on the grid, he won again in the rain at Zandvoort and added a third at the Nürburgring. But he ran into trouble at Magny-Cours, being penalised in qualifying for passing the chequered flag twice, and crashing into Filip Salaquarda in the race. Hülkenberg finished his rookie season 3rd in the championship, with four wins and 72 points.

Hülkenberg won the non-championship Masters of Formula 3 race at Zolder from teammate (and F3 Euro Series championship leader) Romain Grosjean after Grosjean stalled at the start. Hülkenberg won the Formula 3 Euro Series championship in 2008. He amassed 76 of his total of 85 points during the feature races on Saturdays, taking seven wins in the progress.

GP2 Series (2009)

Hülkenberg made his GP2 Asia Series début for the ART Grand Prix team at the third round of the 2008–09 GP2 Asia Series in Bahrain, where he took pole position at his first attempt. He finished both races in fourth place and this left him in seventh place in the championship. His second race weekend in Qatar, saw him become the first night race pole-sitter, and promptly turned that into becoming the first race-winner under lights after a dominant performance. Such was his performance that he ended up over thirteen seconds clear of second-placed driver Sergio Pérez. He finished third in the sprint race, taking his championship points tally to 27 from just four races. Despite this, he finished sixth in the championship.

Hülkenberg continued with ART into the 2009 GP2 Series, partnering Pastor Maldonado, and took his first win in dominant fashion, during his home round of the series at the Nürburgring. With the series' top eight inverted grid, Hülkenberg started eighth for the sprint race. He won the sprint race as well, becoming the first driver to do the weekend double since Giorgio Pantano at Monza in the 2006 season. In doing so, he became only the second driver to complete the clean sweep, with pole position, two fastest laps and two wins; equalling the achievements of Nelson Piquet Jr., who achieved it at the Hungaroring, also in 2006. Hülkenberg clinched the title with two races to spare, after a third-place finish in the Monza sprint race, shadowing Brazilians Luiz Razia and Lucas di Grassi home. The result left him with an unassailable 22-point lead heading to the final round, and in the process becoming the first driver to clinch the championship without the need for a final round decider. He became the third rookie GP2 champion after Nico Rosberg and Lewis Hamilton, and the second behind Hamilton to win the GP3/F3 title, and the GP2/F2 title in consecutive years. A fifth win followed at the Autódromo Internacional do Algarve, allowing Hülkenberg to break the 100-point barrier, and eventually won the title by 25 points from Vitaly Petrov. Worthy of note is that Hülkenberg ended the season 64 points clear of his teammate Pastor Maldonado, who would later go on to get his Williams race seat for the 2011 Formula One season.

Formula One

Hülkenberg first drove a Formula One car in a test for Williams in 2007. His manager, Willi Weber, had organised the test after failing to conclude a deal with Renault boss Flavio Briatore. The two-day test was held at the Circuito de Jerez in Spain, and Hülkenberg outpaced Williams's driver Kazuki Nakajima, and set laptimes 0.4 seconds slower than Nico Rosberg. Hülkenberg's performance at the test led to the Williams team signing him as a test driver, and he competed in several test sessions in addition to racing in lower formulae. His test contract with Williams was extended for 2009, despite in-season tests being banned from that season. Hülkenberg would also act as the team's reserve driver, in the event of the regular drivers being unable to compete.

Williams (2010)
Hülkenberg's teammate for his first season would be the experienced driver Rubens Barrichello, who moved from Brawn GP which in turn was bought out by Mercedes-Benz.

At the second round in Australia, he was involved in a first-lap incident with Kamui Kobayashi, after the Japanese driver's front wing failed and sent him into the barrier, rebounding into the path of Hülkenberg. At the third round in Malaysia, Hülkenberg made it to Q3 for the first time, qualifying in fifth place; out-qualifying teammate Barrichello for the first time. Hülkenberg looked set to finish eleventh in the race until Fernando Alonso blew his engine three laps from the end, thus promoting Hülkenberg to tenth place and with the new-for-2010 points system, Hülkenberg along with Jaime Alguersuari scored their first points in Formula One. He was tenth again at Silverstone, and at the  he finished sixth, a career best. He also picked up points finishes in Italy, Singapore, and Korea. Towards the end of the season there were reports that he could lose his seat at Williams to the GP2 Series champion Pastor Maldonado due to the money Maldonado could bring to the team. Force India's Adrian Sutil was also linked to replace Hülkenberg at Williams.

This was the Williams team's first pole position since the 2005 European Grand Prix. Hülkenberg completed a final lap after pole position was already secured, increasing his gap to the rest of the field. After losing the lead on the opening lap, he eventually finished the race in eighth place, having been passed by drivers in more competitive cars.

Force India (2011–2012)
2011

On 26 January 2011, Hülkenberg was confirmed as Force India's reserve driver for the  season, where he would drive for the team in the Friday practice sessions. He replaced Paul di Resta, who was promoted to a race position in the team. Hülkenberg competed in the first practice sessions of all the races apart from Monaco, Hungary, Korea, India and Abu Dhabi.

2012

On 16 December 2011, Force India announced di Resta and Hülkenberg would be their drivers for the 2012 season.
He had been running 2nd in the race, when he was jumped by Kimi Räikkönen during the pit stops, before the faster Red Bull of Sebastian Vettel passed them both. Hülkenberg did not score any points in Italy or Singapore, but collected points at all of the next five , except on the Yas Marina Circuit where he was involved in a collision on the first lap, and subsequently retired. This was the first time he scored points in more than two races in a row.

In the last race of the season, the 2012 Brazilian Grand Prix, Hülkenberg qualified 7th but was promoted to 6th after Pastor Maldonado received a 10 place grid penalty. By lap three he had moved forward two places and on lap five he passed Fernando Alonso for third place. He moved into second position when McLaren's Lewis Hamilton pitted on lap 11. Hülkenberg then passed Jenson Button at the start of lap 19 to take the lead. He and Button built up a 45-second lead before the safety car was deployed because of debris on the track. He still led until he was passed by Hamilton, after sliding at the entry of Turn 8 on lap 49. On lap 55 he collided with Hamilton when the rear of Hülkenberg's car slid out while trying to pass him at Turn 1. This ended Hamilton's last race for McLaren. After being given a drive-through penalty as a result of the incident, Hülkenberg finished fifth - letting his first race win and podium finish slip through his fingers. Nevertheless, this allowed him to take 11th place in the Drivers' Championship from Kamui Kobayashi.

Hülkenberg finished the year 17 points ahead of his teammate Paul di Resta and he out-qualified him 12 times, to di Resta's eight.

Sauber (2013)
On 31 October 2012 Sauber confirmed that they had signed Hülkenberg for the 2013 season.

Hülkenberg failed to start the  due to a leak in the fuel system of his Sauber C32; he had qualified eleventh for the race, but was withdrawn for safety reasons. Hülkenberg put in his best qualifying performance of the season to date at the Italian Grand Prix to put himself 3rd on the grid. After losing two places to the Ferraris of Felipe Massa and Fernando Alonso, he managed to keep 5th place even though harried by the Mercedes of Nico Rosberg towards the end of the race. By finishing in fifth place, he overtook Toro Rosso driver Jean-Éric Vergne in the Drivers' Championship. His best finish was at the Korean Grand Prix where he finished 4th after close battle with Hamilton and Alonso, in which he showed impressive defending skills and made no mistakes, in a battle where he overtook Hamilton more than once.

Return to Force India (2014–2016)
2014

On 3 December 2013, Force India confirmed they had signed Hülkenberg for 2014 to race alongside Sergio Pérez. Another fifth place at Bahrain put Hülkenberg in third place of the drivers' standings, behind the two Mercedes drivers, Lewis Hamilton and Nico Rosberg.

At the  Hülkenberg took sixth place, taking eight points. He fell to fourth place in the Drivers' Championship after Fernando Alonso finished in third place. Force India lost second in the Constructors' Championship to Red Bull Racing.

Consistent point scoring runs throughout the season meant that Hülkenberg finished the season in 9th place in the Drivers' Championship with 96 points, a career best, compared to his teammate's 59 points and helped Force India achieve sixth place in the Constructors' Championship, following the improvements of Williams and McLaren throughout the season. His best result of the season was fifth place, which he achieved four times.

In October 2014, Force India confirmed they had re-signed Hülkenberg for 2015.

2015

In the opening round in Australia, he finished seventh, a lap down. However, he would not score again, in an uncompetitive Force India, until Canada. In Hungary, mid-race, he suffered a big crash at turn one when his front wing detached and he drove over it, sending him slightly airborne and into the barriers, costing him a potential fourth place. He then failed to finish five of the next seven races. In Belgium, he had a power unit failure on the way to the grid, while in Singapore, he was tagged by Felipe Massa at turn three and spun into the barriers, and received a three place grid penalty after being deemed responsible. In Russia he spun at turn two at the start and collected Marcus Ericsson, potentially costing him a podium finish, and in the United States he slid into Daniel Ricciardo and broke his front right suspension.

He finished the season 10th with 58 points, 20 points behind his teammate, and helped Force India to secure fifth place in the Constructors' Championship and his best result of the season was sixth, which he achieved three times.

2016

Hülkenberg again raced for Force India in 2016 alongside Sergio Pérez.

In the opening round in Australia, he finished seventh. He would finish the next two races in 15th position with the Force India being uncompetitive. In Russia, he was hit by his former teammate Esteban Gutiérrez and retired from the race. He would also retire from the next race with an oil leak. A podium, once again, escaped Hülkenberg's grasp in Monaco. He qualified fifth and was set to finish on the podium, when he got stuck in traffic following his pit stop and his teammate jumped him for the final podium place. He eventually finished sixth, passing the eventual World Champion Nico Rosberg, who had struggled throughout the race, just before the finish line on the last lap. This was followed by points finishes at the next two races. He spun in qualifying during the 2016 European Grand Prix held at Baku, when the Force India was very competitive. This caused him to qualify 13th and finish 9th while Pérez qualified 2nd (demoted to seventh after a grid penalty) and finished third. At the following race in Austria, he put in another strong qualifying performance to qualify third, which became second when Nico Rosberg served his five-place grid penalty. However, he had a poor start, and was overtaken by quicker cars as the race went on, until his brakes failed and he had to retire. This was followed by five consecutive points finishes, including fourth at the 2016 Belgian Grand Prix, his best result of the season, when he was initially running second after the first lap but was eventually passed by the faster cars of Daniel Ricciardo and Lewis Hamilton. At the following race in Singapore, he was involved in a first lap collision, where he was squeezed between two drivers, and had to retire from the race. Hülkenberg finished eighth at the next two races. Having announced his decision to move to Renault for the 2017 season before the 2016 United States Grand Prix, Hülkenberg put on some rejuvenated performances. He qualified seventh in the US, before retiring after being squeezed in between Valtteri Bottas and Sebastian Vettel. He then qualified fifth in Mexico, ahead of the Ferraris and finished seventh. He outqualified his teammate again in Brazil and was running fourth, but he picked up a puncture from debris on the track, following Kimi Räikkönen's crash, costing him a podium finish, and fell outside the points before recovering to seventh, fending off Daniel Ricciardo towards the end of the race. He capped off his season in Abu Dhabi by outqualifying Pérez again to seventh place and finishing in the same position, having survived a collision with Max Verstappen on the first lap.

Hülkenberg scored 72 points in the season, finishing ninth in the Drivers' Championship and helping Force India finish the Constructors' Championship in fourth.

Renault (2017–2019)
2017

On 14 October 2016, Renault Sport announced that Hülkenberg had signed a multiyear agreement to race with the Renault Sport Formula One team.

He got his first points for the team at the third race of the season in Bahrain with 9th place, followed by 8th in Russia. Hülkenberg then finished in 6th place in Spain, Renault's best result in the sport since returning in 2016. His point scoring streak ended in Monaco when he retired, when running in the points, with gearbox issues. He finished 8th in Canada, which was followed by a retirement in Azerbaijan, when he clumsily clipped the wall while running in a promising 6th place. In Austria, he finished 13th, finishing behind his teammate Jolyon Palmer for the first time, following a bad start.

A new Renault upgrade brought massive improvement at the 2017 British Grand Prix as Hülkenberg qualified and finished 6th. The car also proved to be the 'best of the rest' (behind Mercedes, Ferrari and Red Bull) in Hungary as he qualified 7th, but a 5 place grid penalty for a new gearbox meant that he started 12th on the grid. He was set to score points in the race, before a slow pit stop dropped him down the field and he eventually retired from the race. There was an incident during the race, when Kevin Magnussen had pushed Hülkenberg off the track as they were battling for position. Magnussen received a time penalty for the incident. Hülkenberg rudely confronted Magnussen while he was interviewed by Danish TV in the media pen, labelling him 'nasty' and the 'most unsporting driver of the whole grid' and Magnussen calmly responded with 'suck my balls, honey'. Hülkenberg entered the summer break with 26 points and in 10th place in the championship.

Hülkenberg returned from the summer break in Belgium in good form as he qualified 7th and finished 6th in the race. At Singapore, it was announced that Carlos Sainz Jr. would replace Jolyon Palmer, who at that time had scored 0 points to Hülkenberg's 34 points, for the 2018 season. Hülkenberg qualified 'best of the rest' in 7th. After the first lap of the race, Hülkenberg found himself in 3rd place, following the first corner collision and subsequent retirements of Sebastian Vettel, Kimi Räikkönen, Max Verstappen and the fast-starting McLaren of Fernando Alonso. He looked set to take his long-awaited first podium finish in Formula 1, until Daniil Kvyat crashed and brought out the Safety Car and a blunder in strategy by Renault left him in 5th place. He eventually got up to 4th place, before an oil leak brought about his retirement from the race, in which he succeeded Adrian Sutil to become the record holder for the most starts in Formula 1 without a podium finish.

At the Japanese Grand Prix, it was announced that Carlos Sainz Jr. would replace Palmer for the rest of the season beginning at the next Grand Prix in Austin. In the race, he was running comfortably in the points for the majority of the race, when a failure in the DRS mechanism of his car, meant he had to retire from the race. In their time together as teammates Hülkenberg scored 34 points to Palmer's 8 points and outqualified Palmer in all 16 races.
In the USA, Hülkenberg retired on lap 4 with an engine issue. In Mexico, he once again retired, again from a net 4th place, with an engine issue. This was the third time in a row that he had failed to finish a race and the fourth time in five races. At the Brazilian Grand Prix, he led home teammate Sainz to 10th place, his first points in almost 3 months, with his previous points finish being his 6th-place finish at Belgium in August. 
He qualified 'best of the rest' in Abu Dhabi with 7th place. He finished the race in 6th place, having received a contentious 5-second penalty for passing Sergio Pérez off the track at the start of the race, when many believed he should have given the position back. He ended up building enough of a gap to Pérez that the time penalty did not affect his position. With 6th place, Renault overtook Toro Rosso in the Constructors' Championship for 6th place.

This confirmed Renault's position as 6th in the Constructors' Championship and moved Hülkenberg up to 43 points for the season, the same as Massa, but courtesy of more 6th-place finishes, he ended the season 10th in the standings. He had outqualified his teammates over the course of the season 19-1 and outscored his teammates 43–14 over the course of the season.

2018
For the 2018 season, Hülkenberg remained at Renault, alongside Carlos Sainz, who was competing in his first full season for the Renault F1 team.

Hülkenberg and Renault started the season well with a 7th and two 6th places in the first 3 races. The first race in Australia with Sainz finishing in 10th, marked the first double points finish for Renault in F1 since the 2011 Turkish Grand Prix. At the fourth race of the season in Baku, Hülkenberg was handed a 5 place grid penalty for changing his damaged gearbox. He qualified 9th and would start 14th. This meant the end of his streak of starting the last 6 races 7th on the grid. He had made his way up to 5th place by lap 10, when he lost the rear of his car on lap 10, and clattered the wall with his left rear tyre and retired with suspension damage, ending his 5 race point-scoring streak. It was second time in two years that he had retired from a top 6 position in Baku from an unforced error.

Hülkenberg's misfortune continued at the next race in Spain. He went out in Q1 for the first time in 59 races due to a fuel pressure problem with his car. Then he was taken out by the spinning Romain Grosjean on the first lap of the race. Hülkenberg criticised Grosjean's driving following the crash, for which the Frenchman received a grid penalty for the next race. In Monaco, Hülkenberg was outqualified by a teammate by merit for the first time since the 2016 Japanese Grand Prix. Nevertheless, he finished the race in 8th, having started in 11th, with his teammate Sainz obeying team orders late in the race to let him past. He followed this up with another point-scoring finish in Canada after qualifying and finishing the race in 7th. The next three races made up Formula One's first ever triple header in France, Austria and Britain. Hülkenberg finished 9th in France, followed by a retirement from 9th in Austria with an engine failure. It was his 3rd retirement in 6 races and his 7th retirement in his last 16 races. However, he finished the triple header on a high, finishing 6th at the British Grand Prix. Hülkenberg achieved his best ever result for Renault at his home grand prix in Germany with 5th place, overtaking Kevin Magnussen late on when the rain started to fall. After a refuelling problem limited him to only 13th on the grid, he finished 12th at the Hungarian Grand Prix. Nevertheless, he entered the summer break with 52 points and 7th in the championship as the effective leader of the midfield, which many drivers had started to dub the B championship of Formula 1 or 'Formula 1.5', due to very large gap in performance to the top three teams of Mercedes, Ferrari and Red Bull.

In Belgium, Hülkenberg triggered a massive first corner collision after starting 18th due to engine penalties. Hülkenberg outbraked himself and hit Fernando Alonso, who was launched above the Sauber of Charles Leclerc, with one of Alonso's tyres hitting the new controversially introduced safety device, the halo. The collision also ultimately ended the races of both Kimi Räikkönen and Daniel Ricciardo. Hülkenberg was deemed to have 'completely misjudged the situation' by the race stewards and handed a 10 place grid penalty for the next race. The spectacular crash was likened to the crash at the 2012 Belgian Grand Prix initiated by Romain Grosjean. Following the incident, Hülkenberg who had been a vocal opposer to the halo, introduced in 2018, admitted that it was 'pretty useful'.

Hülkenberg suffered a tough period of results, coinciding with Renault's loss of competitiveness, by only scoring 1 point in the next 4 races. He bounced back with a 6th-place finish at the United States Grand Prix. With Sainz finishing in 7th, this was the best team result for Renault in a race since they rejoined the sport in 2016, beating the 7th and 8th place the two drivers had achieved in Canada earlier in the year. This was followed by another strong race in Mexico with another 6th place. His season ended with two successive retirements due to high engine temperatures in Brazil and after being rolled over into the barriers by Romain Grosjean in Abu Dhabi.

Nevertheless, he finished the season as the "champion of the rest" in 7th place with 69 points, 7 points ahead of Sergio Pérez, as Renault also secured 4th place in the Constructor's Championship.

2019

For the 2019 season, Hülkenberg was joined at Renault by multiple Grand Prix winner Daniel Ricciardo, who was signed from Red Bull. Hülkenberg, yet to score a podium in 158 races by the beginning of the 2019 season, said his "future in the sport depends on the outcome of the duel" as his ability could be measured "against a Grand Prix winner", for the first time since his rookie season in 2010, when he was teammate to Rubens Barrichello at Williams. Meanwhile, Renault managing director, Cyril Abiteboul, believed that the driver pairing was "one of the strongest - if not the strongest - driver line-up on the grid".

Hülkenberg started the season strongly, outqualifying new teammate Ricciardo at his home race, but an engine issue prevented him from reaching Q3, leaving him 11th. He made a very strong start and finished the race in 7th. However, he was hit by misfortune in the next race in Bahrain. An engine mapping issue restricted him to 17th in qualifying. However, he had a fantastic race, moving up 11 places and being on course to finish 6th, surviving contact with Ricciardo on the way, when the Australian slid into him as Hülkenberg overtook him. Then, on lap 53, 4 laps from the end, disaster struck as both Hülkenberg and Ricciardo, running 6th and 10th respectively, both retired with engine issues at the same corner. Abiteboul stated that Renault's engine problems were "unacceptable". These issues were compounded, when Hülkenberg again retired from a points-scoring position with engine issues at the next race in China, this time with a software issue. In Spain, Hülkenberg crashed in qualifying and damaged his front wing. He had to fit a different specification front wing, which broke parc fermé rules, ensuring he would have to start the race in the pit lane. He would finish the race in 13th. In the following race in Monaco, a chance of a points finish evaporated, when the Ferrari of Charles Leclerc hit Hülkenberg, while attempting an overtaking move, which the German labelled "too ambitious". Both drivers suffered punctures. Hülkenberg recovered to 13th, but Leclerc eventually retired from the race. He then finished the next two races in 7th and 8th place in Canada and France respectively. At the British Grand Prix, he recovered to a 10th-place finish, after he was hit by former teammate Sergio Pérez and his engine momentarily failing and going into 'limp mode', whilst also bemoaning the team's strategy. Hülkenberg then crashed out of his home race in precarious wet conditions. He was in 4th place, having run as high as 2nd at one point, when he crashed out at Turn 16, where fellow drivers Charles Leclerc, race leader Lewis Hamilton and former teammate Carlos Sainz also went off. The latter two managed to survive their incidents and continue, while both Leclerc and Hülkenberg retired. Both retirees criticised the run-off of the corner, which is a different tarmac used for dragster racing, which meant there was no grip in the wet conditions to help prevent the accident. At the following race in Hungary, Hülkenberg was in the running for points, but then he suffered yet another engine problem on his Renault, which meant he was only able to finish in 12th place. Going into the summer break, Hülkenberg was only 14th in the championship with 17 points, 5 points behind new teammate Daniel Ricciardo in 11th place. Renault's points total of 39 points was 43 points behind the position they were in the previous year, after they suffered a disappointing first half of the season.

Just before the Belgian GP it was announced by Renault that Hülkenberg would be replaced by Mercedes reserve driver and former Force India driver Esteban Ocon for the 2020 season. Hülkenberg said the decision was "not only about performance", alluding that the French Renault team desired a French driver, such as Ocon. Four-time World Champion Alain Prost, non-executive director for Renault Sport, said that Renault offered Hülkenberg a new one-year contract, but the German refused the offer.

Hülkenberg would continue with Renault for the rest of the season, and started the second half of the season strongly by qualifying 7th in Belgium. A grid penalty meant he started 12th, and he fell even further back when he took evasive action to avoid collisions involving Verstappen, Räikkönen, Ricciardo and Stroll. However, he executed an alternate two-stop strategy and made up 3 places in the last lap to finish 8th. In Italy, both Renaults had a very strong weekend, with Ricciardo and Hülkenberg qualifying 5th and 6th respectively, with both drivers moving up a place to finish 4th and 5th, after Sebastian Vettel spun out of contention. This was Renault's best points haul since returning to the sport in 2016, and Hülkenberg's joint best result for the team.

In Singapore, Hülkenberg had initially qualified 9th but as teammate Daniel Ricciardo had been disqualified from qualifying as his car exceeded the MGU-K power limit, he started the race in 8th. In the race, Hülkenberg was involved in a first lap collision with former teammate Carlos Sainz Jr. Both drivers suffered punctures and had to pit on the first lap and fell to the back of the field. However, he managed to recover to 9th place for his 3rd points finish in a row. Hülkenberg started the next race in an impressive 6th place. However, his race was compromised by a bad start which left him outside the top 10. Having recovered to 9th place, the Renault pit crew dropped his car off the jack, which again dropped him out of the top 10. He eventually recovered to finish in 10th, overtaking Lance Stroll towards the end of the race. After the race, Hülkenberg said that "everything that could go wrong did go wrong". Further misfortune hit Hülkenberg in Japan. He was restricted to only 15th in qualifying, after a mechanical failure in Q2 meant he could not set a representative time to progress further. However, in the race he made a fantastic start and was up to 10th place by the end of the first lap and he would end up finishing the race in that position. However, following a protest by rival constructor Racing Point, both Renault cars were disqualified for having a pre-set automated brake bias system that was deemed to be a driver aid, and thus illegal. This was Hülkenberg's first disqualification in his entire F1 career.

He then managed to salvage a point at the following race with 10th after he was spun into the wall by Daniil Kvyat at the last corner of the last lap, when running in 9th. He crossed the line in 11th, without a rear wing, but was promoted to 10th after Kvyat was penalised for the incident. He followed this up with yet another points finish in the USA with 9th place. He suffered a difficult race in Brazil, where two safety car periods interfered in his strategy and left him 12th on the line. He was penalised for overtaking Kevin Magnussen before the safety car line during the safety car restart, and thus was classified 15th, his worst result of the year. He was voted Driver of the Day in the season finale in Abu Dhabi,  taking the title for the first time, after finishing 12th in what was his possible final race in Formula One, having failed to secure a drive for the 2020 season.

He finished the season in 14th place, his lowest placing in the standings in the sport since his debut season in 2010, having scored 37 points across the season, 17 less than teammate Daniel Ricciardo.

Racing Point (2020)
Hülkenberg did not have a contract for the 2020 F1 season. He replaced Sergio Pérez at Racing Point for the British Grand Prix and 70th Anniversary Grand Prix after Pérez tested positive for SARS-2 coronavirus. For the British Grand Prix he qualified thirteenth but did not start the race due to an engine failure before the start of the race. Hülkenberg would get another chance to race for the team at the 70th Anniversary Grand Prix  also at Silverstone Circuit after Pérez tested positive for COVID-19 again.  He qualified in third behind the two Mercedes cars and although was on course to finish in 4th, Hülkenberg unexpectedly had high levels of tyre wear, which forced him to pit again. He then went on to finish seventh behind teammate Lance Stroll. Hülkenberg did not race at the Spanish Grand Prix as Sergio Pérez returned to racing after testing negative for COVID-19. He would replace the team's other driver, Lance Stroll, for the Eifel Grand Prix after the Canadian had sat out final practice due to feeling unwell. He finished the race in 8th after qualifying 20th, and last, on the grid, winning him the fans' vote of "Driver of the Day".

Aston Martin (2021–2022)
Aston Martin F1 Team (previously Racing Point) signed Hülkenberg as a reserve and development driver for the  season.

Hülkenberg started and finished the race in 17th place. Hülkenberg returned to Aston Martin in the following race, the Saudi Arabian Grand Prix starting in 17th and finishing in 12th place. 

Hülkenberg got back into the Aston Martin in the post-Hungarian GP Pirelli tests, alongside Lance Stroll to develop the 2023 tyres.

Haas (2023–) 
In November 2022 it was confirmed Hülkenberg will drive as a full time F1-driver with Haas F1 Team during 2023, partnering Kevin Magnussen and replacing fellow German compatriot Mick Schumacher. The first race at the  saw Hülkenberg qualify tenth and finish fifteenth, behind his teammate Magnussen. He had also picked up a fifteen-second penalty for exceeding track limits, which ultimately did not affect his final position in the race.

Sportscar racing

It was confirmed in November 2014 that Hülkenberg would compete in the 2015 24 Hours of Le Mans in a third factory-backed Porsche 919 Hybrid. He also contested the Spa-Francorchamps round of the World Endurance Championship as preparation.

On 14 June 2015, he won the 24 Hours of Le Mans race, driving alongside Britain's Nick Tandy and Earl Bamber of New Zealand. They completed 395 laps, one lap ahead of the car of their Porsche teammates Mark Webber, Brendon Hartley and Timo Bernhard, who took second place. This win was Porsche's first overall victory in the event since the 1998 24 Hours of Le Mans. Hülkenberg's triumph made him the first active Formula One driver to win at Le Mans since Johnny Herbert and Bertrand Gachot, who performed the same feat in 1991.

IndyCar test
On 25 October 2021, Hülkenberg took part in a private IndyCar test at Barber Motorsports Park, driving the No. 7 Arrow McLaren SP (AMSP) car, with AMSP team principal Taylor Kiel stating in a report that Hülkenberg was in consideration for a third part-time entry in 2022. After completing over 100 laps, he set a best time of 77.454 seconds in his first test, roughly a second off of the fastest time, which was set by 2021 Indy Lights runner-up David Malukas. Hülkenberg ultimately declined an opportunity to pursue a career in IndyCar with McLaren, stating that he was unwilling to race on ovals and that he found the Dallara DW12 to be significantly harder to drive physically than the Formula One cars he was used to.

Other activities 
Hülkenberg has entered his own team in the eSkootr Championship, named "27X by Nico Hülkenberg".

Personal life 
Hülkenberg lives in Monaco. He is married to Lithuanian fashion designer Eglė Ruškytė, having been in a relationship with her since 2015. Together they have one daughter born in 2021.

Karting record

Karting career summary

Racing record

Racing career summary

 Season still in progress.

Single seater racing results

Complete Formula BMW ADAC results
(key) (Races in bold indicate pole position, races in italics indicate fastest lap)

Complete German Formula Three Championship results
(key) (Races in bold indicate pole position, races in italics indicate fastest lap)

Complete A1 Grand Prix results
(key) (Races in bold indicate pole position; races in italics indicate fastest lap)

Complete Formula 3 Euro Series results
(key) (Races in bold indicate pole position; races in italics indicate fastest lap)

Complete GP2 Asia Series results
(key) (Races in bold indicate pole position; races in italics indicate fastest lap)

Complete GP2 Series results
(key) (Races in bold indicate pole position; races in italics indicate fastest lap)

Complete Formula One results
(key) (Races in bold indicate pole position; races in italics indicate fastest lap)

 Driver failed to finish the race, but was classified as he had completed more than 90% of the race distance.
 Season still in progress.

Sports car racing results

24 Hours of Le Mans results

Complete FIA World Endurance Championship results

References

External links

 

1987 births
Living people
People from Emmerich am Rhein
Sportspeople from Düsseldorf (region)
Racing drivers from North Rhine-Westphalia
German racing drivers
Formula BMW ADAC drivers
German Formula Three Championship drivers
24 Hours of Le Mans winning drivers
A1 Team Germany drivers
Formula 3 Euro Series drivers
Formula 3 Euro Series champions
GP2 Series drivers
GP2 Series Champions
GP2 Asia Series drivers
German Formula One drivers
Williams Formula One drivers
Force India Formula One drivers
Sauber Formula One drivers
Renault Formula One drivers
Racing Point Formula One drivers
Josef Kaufmann Racing drivers
ART Grand Prix drivers
Porsche Motorsports drivers
Aston Martin Formula One drivers
Haas Formula One drivers
Karting World Championship drivers
A1 Grand Prix drivers
Super Nova Racing drivers
German expatriate sportspeople in Monaco